Strawberries is the fifth studio album by English punk rock band the Damned. It was released in October 1982 by record label Bronze.

Background 
The record was released as the Damned were enjoying a higher public profile, thanks to the solo success of Captain Sensible. Sensible performed lead vocals on "Life Goes On" and "Don't Bother Me". He also introduced new instruments to the band, including sitar, and cello played by his then-girlfriend, Rachael Bor of the pop group Dolly Mixture.

While Strawberries was generally praised for its positive, up-beat melodies, the album marked a time of conflict and division within the band. During the recording, bassist Paul Gray fought with drummer Rat Scabies over management and song-writing responsibilities. Gray would leave the band in February 1983 (later replacing Billy Sheehan in UFO), and Bryn Merrick took over on bass. Keyboard player Roman Jugg officially became the Damned's fifth band member. His arrival led to further experiments with the band's sound, including loops and sampling. Jugg would later move to guitar, replacing Sensible, who left the band after the Strawberries concert tour.

In 1982 Robert Fripp of King Crimson joined the Damned in the studio during the recording of this album. However, the only track they recorded together, "Fun Factory", was left off the album and did not receive any official release until 1990. Robert also joined the band on stage for a few songs on 11 October 1982 at the Hammersmith Odeon. A bootleg of this concert is available but is of low quality.

As an easter egg, the band included various sounds at the end of different tracks, including an egg whisk and a pair of jeans being ripped. At the end of the track "Bad Time for Bonzo", a sound of a flushing toilet was used.

The album's working title was Strawberries for Pigs, a name inspired by the reception the band's newer music received from some of their older fans. As Vanian explained, "we were playing a lot of new material, and we had an audience that didn't want to hear about anything, they just wanted to hear "Neat Neat Neat" and "New Rose," nothing else. And they wanted to just smash everything. And they weren't interested in hearing music at all. So at one point, I turned around and said, 'It's like giving strawberries to a fucking pig, this gig, you know?' And that stuck in our minds, and we used it".

Release 
Strawberries was released in October 1982. Limited editions included a strawberry-scented lyric insert. The album reached No. 15 in the Official UK Album chart.

Reception 
Critics praised the album's musicianship and 60s influences. Writing in Smash Hits, Fred Dellar gave the album 9 out of 10: "The Damned go totally melodic, offer harmony vocals, employ cellos, sitars and brass sections, and even remember to include a lyric sheet […] This is the kind of pop album Paul McCartney would be pleased to have his moniker on". 

In Sounds, Steve Keaton wrote that "Strawberries is the Damned at their most melodic and subversive". He added that the album "manages to indulge both Dave Vanian’s darkly obsessive Gothic vision and the good Captain's psychedelic whims without sacrificing any hard rock sensibilities. 'Strawberries' should be the LP to grant the Damned the recognition they've courted for so long".

Trouser Press described the album as "eclectic and inconsistent but well-produced [...] and boasting some fine tunes [...], [Strawberries] shows Sensible's increasing pop prominence [...] and Vanian's willingness to explore a stylistic pallette with no debt to punk". Other critics have noted the album's embrace of psychedelic pop, as well as gothic rock.

In a negative contemporary review, NME called Strawberries "a miserable (w)retch of a record, spewing fourth enough nauseous 'nostalgia' to fill a book entitled 'Why The Damned Never Made It', without once touching any spirit. It seems they're doomed to regurgitating their history 'til the aftertaste becomes too bad to bear".

AllMusic's retrospective review was favourable: "Recuperating a bit from The Black Album's uneven impact while still aiming to try whatever they want in studio, [...] [Strawberries is] by turns sprightly and cheerful, dark and dramatic, energetic and snarling, or all that and more at once, [...] [and] defies usual expectations to be yet another good rock album from the band".

Reissue 
On 7 January 2005, Castle Records re-released Strawberries in the United Kingdom on CD. On October 7, 2022, Iconoclassic Records issued a 40th Anniversary 2 CD Edition of Strawberries remastered by Mark Wilder, including 15 bonus tracks and new liner notes by Jack Rabid of The Big Takeover.

Track listing 

Credits adapted from the album's liner notes.

Note

Some versions of Strawberries have altered songwriting credits.

2005 deluxe edition
The previously untitled 30-second long instrumental harpsichord piece between track 7 ("Pleasure and the Pain") and track 8 ("Life Goes On") on the original album has been titled "The Missing Link" and given its own track number, track 8, on the deluxe edition.

Notes
 Tracks 13 and 14 from the "Lovely Money" single, released June 1982; produced by the Damned and Tony Mansfield; track 13 features spoken word by Viv Stanshall.
 Tracks 15-17 from the "Dozen Girls" single, released September 1982; produced by the Damned.
 Tracks 18 and 20 from the "Generals" single, released November 1982; a Bimbeo Production.

2022 40th Anniversary 2 CD Edition

Notes
 Track 1 from the Fun Factory (song) single, released January 1991; produced by Captain Sensible; features guitar by Robert Fripp.
 Tracks 2-4 from the Lovely Money single, released June 1982; produced by the Damned and Tony Mansfield; tracks 2 & 4 feature spoken word by Viv Stanshall.
 Tracks 5-8 from the Dozen Girls single, released September 1982; produced by the Damned.
 Tracks 9 and 10 from the Generals (song) single, released November 1982; a Bimbeo Production.
 Tracks 11-15 recorded live at The Mayfair, Newcastle Upon Tyne, 14th October 1982. From Live at Newcastle album, released November 1983.

Personnel 
 The Damned

 Dave Vanian – lead vocals (1-7, 9, 10)
 Captain Sensible – guitar, backing and lead (8, 11, 15, 17) vocals, keyboards, sitar (10)
 Paul Gray – bass
 Rat Scabies – drums, synthesizer
 Roman Jugg – keyboard solos

 Additional musicians

 Simon Lloyd – brass (2)
 Rachel Bor – cello (7)

 Technical

 The Damned – producer (1–11)
 Hugh Jones – co-producer (1, 4, 6–9, 11), engineer
 Dave Vanian – album cover design
 Martin Poole – album cover design
 Linda Roast – album cover concept
 Nigel Greerson – sleeve photography

References

External links 

 

1982 albums
The Damned (band) albums
Albums produced by Hugh Jones (producer)
Bronze Records albums
Albums recorded at Rockfield Studios